Harby Sangha (born 19 May 1986) is an Indian actor, comedian, and singer. He started his professional career as a comedian in 2004 and became an actor with the film Asan Nu Maan Watna Da.He is primarily known for supporting roles in the Punjabi cinema.

Biography 
Sangha was born in a village called Sangha Jagir in Nakodar, Jalandhar, Punjab, India.

Before becoming a comedian, he worked as a compounder. He was introduced by the renowned Punjabi actor Gurpreet Singh Waraich, commonly known as Gurpreet Ghuggi in the Punjabi TV and film industry. In 2001, he was first featured on the Gurpreet Ghuggi television show Ghuggi De Barati in the song "Khali Mudi Barat".

Sangha usually plays comedy roles. He has appeared in the Punjabi TV serials like Yug Badal Gaya and Din’. His notable work include films like Carry On Jatta, Romeo Ranjha, Laavaan Phere, Nikka Zaildar 2, Qismat, Aate Di Chidi, and Parahuna.

Personal life 
Sangha is married to Simran Sangha and has a son and daughter.

Filmography

External links

References 

Indian male comedians
21st-century Indian male actors
Male actors from Punjab, India
Indian male voice actors
Living people
1986 births
People from Jalandhar district